Caroline Elspeth Lillias Weir (born 20 June 1995) is a Scottish professional footballer who plays as an attacking midfielder or forward for Spanish Primera División club Real Madrid CF and the Scotland women's national team.

Club career

Elgin Star 
Weir began her footballing journey playing for local boys team, Elgin Star FC, in the Fife Football Development League at Pitreavie Playing Fields between 2003 and 2005. She played as a midfielder in the 7 a-side games, invariably scoring 2 to 3 goals each game & regularly receiving the player of the match award.

Hibernian 
Weir started her career in the Hibernian Ladies youth system from the age of ten. In 2011, she won the SWFL First Division player of the year award for her performances in Hibs' reserve side while also making her first team debut in May against Glasgow City.

Arsenal 
Weir joined FA WSL side Arsenal Ladies in July 2013 after leaving high school. Whilst at Arsenal, Weir won the 2014 FA Women's Cup.

Bristol Academy 
On 9 July 2015, it was announced that Weir left Arsenal for FA WSL side Bristol Academy.

Liverpool
On 18 January 2016, it was announced that Weir had left relegated Bristol to sign for Liverpool. While at the Reds Weir won the 2016 Liverpool Ladies Player of the Year Award.

Manchester City
On 1 June 2018, Manchester City announced the signing of Weir. Weir won the Player of the Match award in the 2019 WSL Cup Final as Manchester City beat Arsenal 4–2 on penalties.

Weir scored the winner, a 25-yard strike, as Manchester City defeated Manchester United 1–0 in the inaugural Manchester derby on 7 September 2019. The goal was subsequently nominated for the FIFA Puskas Award 2020.

On 31 January 2020, she signed a new contract with Manchester City until 2022.

On 29 November 2021, another goal against Manchester United on 12 February 2021 – a chip from the edge of the area – was nominated for the FIFA Puskas Award 2021. Almost exactly a year later she scored a very similar goal against the same opposition.

Real Madrid
On 7 July 2022, Real Madrid announced the signing of Weir on a free transfer. Shortly after that, a statement was released about a "hold on processing of non-EU licences", affecting the signing of Weir, who was not registered with Real Madrid before 30 June. A month later she scored a goal that knocked her previous club Manchester City out of Champions League qualifying and progressed Real to the second phase.

International career

Scotland
Having represented Scotland at all youth levels, Weir received her first call-up for the Scotland women's senior squad for their match against Iceland in June 2013. She retained her place in the squad for the following game against Germany. During Euro 2017, Weir scored Scotland's opening goal against Spain and was voted player of the game. Weir helped Scotland qualify for the 2019 FIFA Women's World Cup, and played in all of their three matches at the tournament. During the 2023 FIFA Women's World Cup UEFA play-off match against Ireland, which the Irish won 1-0, Weir had a penalty saved.

Great Britain Olympic team
Weir was one of two Scots selected by Great Britain for the 2020 Summer Olympics. Weir was initially credited with scoring in the 1–1 draw with Canada, but it was later denoted as an own goal by Nichelle Prince. She also had a penalty saved during their 4-3 loss to Australia in the quarterfinal.

Career statistics

International appearances
Scotland statistics accurate as of match played 15 June 2021.
Great Britain statistics accurate as of match played 2 August 2021.

International goals
Results list Scotland's goal tally first.

Honours
Arsenal
 FA Women's Cup: 2014

Manchester City
 FA Women's League Cup: 2018–19, 2021–22
 Women's FA Cup: 2018–19, 2019–20
Individual
Scotland Player of the Year: 2016, 2020 
Liverpool Ladies Player of the Year: 2016
NRS Scottish Sporting Breakthrough Award: 2017
PFA Women's Super League (WSL) Team of the Year: 2016–17, 2019–20, 2020–21, 2021–22
PFA Bristol Street Motors Fans’ Player of the Month: December 2020
Puskas Award Nominee: 2020, 2021
SFWA Women's International Player of the Year: 2021–22

 FA Women's Super League Goal of the Month: February 2022

References

External links

1995 births
Living people
Footballers from Dunfermline
Scottish women's footballers
Scotland women's international footballers
Olympic footballers of Great Britain
Hibernian W.F.C. players
Arsenal W.F.C. players
Bristol Academy W.F.C. players
Liverpool F.C. Women players
Manchester City W.F.C. players
Women's Super League players
Women's association football midfielders
2019 FIFA Women's World Cup players
Footballers at the 2020 Summer Olympics
Scottish Women's Premier League players
Real Madrid Femenino players
Primera División (women) players
Scottish expatriate sportspeople in Spain
Scottish expatriate women's footballers
Expatriate women's footballers in Spain
UEFA Women's Euro 2017 players